Acromis spinifex is a species of tortoise beetle from South America. The males have enlarged elytra which are probably used in male–male combat, while females are among the few tortoise beetles to show maternal care of their offspring.

Distribution
Acromis spinifex is found across South America, from Trinidad and Tobago and Venezuela in the north to Peru, northern Argentina and Paraguay in the south.

Description
As with other species in the genus Acromis, A. spinifex shows conspicuous sexual dimorphism. The elytra of males extend sideways and forwards to form flattened plates. Other species in the genus have been studied more closely, and they have been observed to engage in male–male combat, in which the flattened parts of the elytra are often pierced; such holes are frequently found in museum specimens of Acromis.

Ecology and life cycle
The host plants of Acromis spinifex are plants in the family Convolvulaceae, typically Ipomoea species such as the sweet potato, Ipomoea batatas. Predators of A. spinifex include the shield bugs Stiretrus smaragdatus and S. decastigma.

Acromis spinifex is unusual among tortoise beetles in that it practises parental care of its offspring. All stages of the young beetle are guarded by the female, from the egg to the pupa. The female lays a mass of 15 white, oblong eggs, which are glued together and attached to the midrib of a leaf of the host plant. Reports of paternal care derive from an illustration published in 1939 which wrongly showed a male guarding eggs.

Taxonomic history
Acromis spinifex was first described by Carl Linnaeus in his 1763 work Centuria Insectorum, under the name Cassida spinifex. In 1837, it was made the type species of the new genus Acromis by Louis Chevrolat. One lectotype and one paralectotype were designated in 1999 and are deposited in the Naturhistoriska Riksmuseet in Stockholm, Sweden.

References

External links

Cassidinae
Beetles of South America
Beetles described in 1763
Taxa named by Carl Linnaeus